Juan Carlos La Rosa Llontop (born 3 February 1980) is a Peruvian former footballer who played as a midfielder.

Career 
He won the Copa Sudamericana with Cienciano and also the Recopa Sudamericana in 2003 and 2004 respectively.

La Rosa made 13 appearances for the Peru national football team.

Honours

Club
Universitario de Deportes
 Torneo Descentralizado (1): 2013

Cienciano
 Copa Sudamericana: 2003
 Recopa Sudamericana: 2004
 Apertura: 2005

Alianza Lima
 Apertura: 2006
 Torneo Descentralizado (1): 2006

References

External links

1980 births
Living people
People from Lambayeque Region
Association football midfielders
Peruvian footballers
Peru international footballers
Peruvian Primera División players
Juan Aurich footballers
Cienciano footballers
Club Alianza Lima footballers
Total Chalaco footballers
Sport Boys footballers
Club Universitario de Deportes footballers